"19 in 99" is a song by American singer and songwriter Nick Carter. It was the second official single from his third solo album All American.

Music video
The music video of "19 in 99" was released on February 5, 2016, on Vevo and YouTube. The video was directed by Kevin Estrada and produced by Paul Bock and the Production company being Two Bridges Film.

In the video, Nick Carter, now a settled dad uses the opportunity of his wife and children going to the beach and he staying home, and reminisces his younger days while he was "19 in 99" (meaning he was 19 in 1999). He remembers Santa Monica and surfing, listens to 2Pac music on a boombox that he carries on his shoulder whereas and his girlfriend listens to Nirvana. It makes him go back in time and playing video games and running on skateboards, and remembers the days when he and his bandmates led a non-stop party life and spent all their money, just to "live like kings underneath the Hollywood sign".

AJ McLean makes a cameo appearance as a pizza deliver in the music video, watching through a window in astonishment and bemusement as Carter through the window with Carter performing a re-enactment of a scene from the Backstreet Boys song "I Want It That Way".

He tries to tidy the wrecked place before the family returns home but to no avail as he greets them with a practical joke as they come in.

Track listing

References

2015 songs
2016 singles
Nick Carter (musician) songs
Songs about nostalgia
Songs about teenagers
Songs written by Nick Carter (musician)
Songs written by Dan Muckala
Song recordings produced by Dan Muckala